John Lynn may refer to:
John Lynn (VC) (1887–1915), English recipient of the Victoria Cross
John A. Lynn (born 1943), military historian
John P. Lynn, businessman
Johnnie Lynn (born 1956), American football player
John Lynn (painter), British painter of the 19th century
John Galloway Lynn (1803–1883), American businessman

See also
John Linn (disambiguation)